Wang Rui (born 25 May 1963) is a Chinese pharmacologist who is a professor, doctoral supervisor and vice president of Lanzhou University, and an academician of the Chinese Academy of Engineering.

Biography 
Wang was born in Lanzhou, Gansu, on 25 May 1963. He earned a bachelor's degree in 1982, a master's degree in 1985, and a doctor's degree in 1988, all from Lanzhou University and all in pharmaceutical chemistry. He was a postdoctoral fellow at the University of Kansas.

After graduating in 1985, he stayed at the university and worked successively as a lecturer, professor (1995–present), dean of Life Sciences School (1997–2006), dean of Basic Medicine School (2008–2018), and vice president (2018–present). 

He was a member of the 12th National Committee of the Chinese People's Political Consultative Conference and is a member of the 13th Standing Committee of the Chinese People's Political Consultative Conference.

Honours and awards 
 2016 State Technological Invention Award (Second Class)
 2016 Science and Technology Innovation Award of the Ho Leung Ho Lee Foundation
 27 November 2017 Member of the Chinese Academy of Engineering (CAE)

References 

1963 births
Living people
People from Lanzhou
Engineers from Gansu
Lanzhou University alumni
Academic staff of Lanzhou University
Members of the Chinese Academy of Engineering
Members of the 12th Chinese People's Political Consultative Conference
Members of the Standing Committee of the 13th Chinese People's Political Consultative Conference